The Bear Went Over the Mountain (1996) is a novel by William Kotzwinkle. The movie rights for the book were optioned to The Jim Henson Company.

Plot introduction
Arthur Bramhall isolates himself in a forest cabin to write a novel; once it is complete, he goes off to buy champagne in celebration, after first burying the manuscript to protect it from fire. In his absence, a bear digs up his manuscript. The bear reads the manuscript, decides it is good, and brings it to New York City, where he is accepted as a talented author and desirable party guest.

Reception
The book was nominated for the 1997 World Fantasy Award.

References

External links
 Interview with Kotzwinkle about the book.

1996 American novels
American fantasy novels
Books about bears
Novels set in New York City
Novels by William Kotzwinkle